Edward Zouche or Zouch may refer to:
Edward la Zouche, 11th Baron Zouche (1556–1625)
Edward Zouch (died 1634) of Woking